Donald Watson (1910–2005) was an English animal rights advocate and founder of the Vegan Society.

Donald or Don Watson may also refer to:
 Donald Watson (rugby union) (1872–1958), English-born New Zealand rugby union player
 Donald "Monk" Watson (1894–1981), American vaudeville performer
 Donald Watson (artist) (1918–2005), Scottish ornithologist and wildlife artist
 Don Watson (born 1949), Australian author
 Don Watson (Australian footballer) (1905–1948), Australian rules footballer
 Don Watson (English footballer) (born 1932), English football inside forward
 Don Alonzo Watson (1807–1892), American businessman and philanthropist, helped found Western Union

See also
Watson (surname)